is a Japanese association footballer who is currently contracted to AC Nagano Parceiro. He plays as a striker.

Career
Kanazono played a significant amount of junior football before breaking through to the first XI of the Júbilo Iwata side in 2011. He made his debut in the Opening Round 2011 J. League Division 1 match against Ventforet Kofu as late substitute in the 1–0 victory.

Career statistics

Club
Updated to 23 February 2018.

1Includes Emperor's Cup.
2Includes J. League Cup.
3Includes Suruga Bank Championship.

Awards and honours

Club
Júbilo Iwata
Suruga Bank Championship (1): 2011

References

External links
Profile at Ventforet Kofu
Profile at Consadole Sapporo

 
 

1988 births
Living people
Kansai University alumni
Association football people from Osaka Prefecture
Sportspeople from Osaka
Japanese footballers
J1 League players
J2 League players
J3 League players
Júbilo Iwata players
Vegalta Sendai players
Hokkaido Consadole Sapporo players
Ventforet Kofu players
AC Nagano Parceiro players
Association football forwards